American musician Alex G has released nine studio albums and two EPs, as well as a live album and a soundtrack album. His first four studio albums were self-released on the music-sharing website Bandcamp. His fifth album, DSU, was released on Orchid Tapes in 2014, and his subsequent releases have been with the label Domino Recording Company. He has also contributed to songs by various artists and bands including Julia Brown, Frank Ocean, Porches, Japanese Breakfast, and Lil Yachty.

Albums

Studio albums

Live albums

Soundtrack albums

Extended plays

Split releases

Singles

Credits

Notes

References 

Discographies of American artists
Rock music discographies